SF Camerawork is a non-profit art gallery in San Francisco, California dedicated to new ideas and directions in photography.

History 
SF Camerawork was founded in 1974 by John Lamkin and a group of artists, initially calling it "Lamkin Camerawork Gallery".

Allie Haeusslein writes in the British Journal of Photography:

SF Camerawork was founded in 1974 with the mission of promoting emerging photographers and encouraging diverse approaches to the medium; Hal Fischer, Donna-Lee Phillips and Lew Thomas – three influential conceptual photographers of the period – were among those involved in establishing the cooperative organisation. SF Camerawork fearlessly mounted early-career solo exhibitions for Joel-Peter Witkin (1982), Allan Sekula (1985), Uta Barth (1994), Todd Hido (1997), Gregory Halpern (2007) and Meghann Riepenhoff (2016), just a few of the exhibited artists that are now well-known names. It has organised compelling (and, in some cases, prescient) thematic exhibitions about photography in California, photomontage, identity politics, and digital photography.

Additional artists and photographers exhibiting at SF Cameraworks, many early in their careers, include: Kim Abeles, Laura Aguilar, John Baldessari, Dara Birnbaum, Imogen Cunningham, Judy Dater, Carol Flax, Jim Goldberg,  Lynn Hershman, Jenny Holzer, Graciela Iturbide, Barbara Kruger, Suzanne Lacy, Mary Ellen Mark, Pedro Meyer, Shirin Neshat, Adrian Piper, Alan Rath, Jock Reynolds, Sandy Skoglund, Larry Sultan, Catherine Wagner, Carrie Mae Weems, Steina and Woody Vasulka,David Wojnarowitz and Adrian Burell.

Programming 
According to Artweek:

SF camerawork has a dedicated Education Center and Library, with gallery and forum spaces to engage and to exhibit work by students from First Exposures, SF Camerworks’s photography mentoring program for at-risk youth. The 3,000 volume photography reference library includes many rare and out-of-print publications.

Programming has included the publication, Camerawork: A Journal of Photographic Arts and administration of the James D. Phelan Art Award in Photography.

About Solos, a program which began in 2005, and featured two or three artists in simultaneous solo exhibitions, Artweek writer Amber Whiteside states, “The aim of this new series is to provide a platform that accommodates multiple artists’ visions without forcing them together under a curatorial agenda.”

References

External links

501(c)(3) organizations
1974 establishments in California
Art museums and galleries in San Francisco
Contemporary art galleries in the United States
Non-profit organizations based in the San Francisco Bay Area
Arts organizations established in 1974
Photography museums and galleries in the United States